is a  vertically scrolling shooter released as an arcade video game in Japan in 1984. It was developed and published by Namco as an updated version of Xevious (1982) created as a response to the overwhelming success of the original in Japan. It was sold as  conversion kit for existing Xevious cabinets.

Like the original game, the player controls a starship known as the Solvalou, equipped with two weapons: an "air zapper" to defeat flying enemies, and a "blaster bomb" to destroy ground-based enemies. It runs on the Namco Galaga arcade board. New enemy types include metallic Galaxian flagships. Some of these revert the player's score to zero if destroyed. The game was ported to the X68000 and PlayStation and is included in several Namco collections.

Gameplay

Super Xevious is a vertically scrolling shooter and an updated version of Xevious. Its gameplay is largely identical. The player assumes control of a starship, the Solvalou, in its mission to destroy a supercomputer named GAMP and its Xevious forces. The player is attacked by constantly-moving waves of enemies and must avoid collision with them and their projectiles.

The Solvalou has two weapons: a forward-moving shot that destroys flying enemies, and an air-to-surface bomb that destroys ground targets. On occasion, the player faces off against an Andor Genesis ship which can be defeated by destroying its center core or four blaster receptacles. Some areas contain hidden towers ("Sol Citadels") which are uncovered by bombing their locations. Yellow "Special Flags" from Rally-X can also be uncovered, which reward the player with an extra life.

Super Xevious includes multiple additions and changes to the original game. The gameplay overall is harder, with more aggressive enemies and faster-moving projectiles. New enemy types include fighter jets, tanks, helicopters, and silver-plated Galaxian flagships, which are found in specific areas of the game. Some of these enemies reset the player's score to zero upon destruction; however, bonus points are awarded for flying over the tank. The placement of the Sol Citadels and Special Flags have also been changed.

Reception and legacy

Its inclusion in Xevious 3D/G+ drew mixed responses from critics. Graeme Nicholson, a writer for Play UK, believed that while Super was still fun to play and posed enough challenge, its differences from the original Xevious were few and far between and "[spoiled] the idea of the collection slightly". A writer for the Spanish magazine PSX Magazine agreed, describing it as a "decaffinated" variation of its predecessor with little in the way of new content. However, they liked the slightly-refined visuals and overall increase in speed.

Retrospectively in 1998, AllGames Earl Green noted of Supers high level of difficulty and new enemy types, writing that its enhanced challenge and differences in gameplay made it a superior update to Xevious. Retro Gamer writer Stuart Campbell showed appreciation towards its new additions to the game, namely the silver Galaxian bosses.

Former Happy End and Yellow Magic Orchestra member Haruomi Hosono recorded an arranged dance/synthpop version of the game's theme tune, which was released in Japan by Alfa Records' Yen label as a 12" single on August 29, 1984. The single was also released in Europe by Pick Up Records that same year.

Notes

References

External links

1984 video games
Arcade video games
Namco arcade games
Nintendo DS games
PlayStation (console) games
Sharp MZ games
X68000 games
Video game sequels
Xevious
Vertically scrolling shooters
Video games developed in Japan
Video games scored by Yuriko Keino

ja:ゼビウス#スーパーゼビウス